Sergei Stanislavovich Strukov (born 17 September 1982) is a former Russian football forward.

Honours

Club
Aktobe
Kazakhstan Premier League (2): 2008, 2009
Kazakhstan Cup (1): 2008
Kazakhstan Super Cup (2): 2008, 2010

References

External links
 

1982 births
Living people
Russian footballers
Russian expatriate footballers
Russian Premier League players
Kazakhstan Premier League players
FC Rotor Volgograd players
Association football forwards
FC Irtysh Pavlodar players
Expatriate footballers in Kazakhstan
FC Aktobe players
FC Metallurg Lipetsk players
FC Kairat players
FC Kaisar players
FC Tobol players
Russian expatriate sportspeople in Kazakhstan
FC Avangard Kursk players
Sportspeople from Volgograd